Otterlei is a surname. Notable people with the surname include:

Alex Otterlei (born 1968), Belgian composer
Arve Hans Otterlei (born 1932), Norwegian politician